The BMW M8 is the high performance version of the BMW 8 Series (G15) marketed under the BMW M sub-brand.

Introduced in June 2019, the M8 was initially produced in the 2-door convertible (F91 model code) and 2-door coupe (F92 model code) body styles. A 4-door sedan (F93 model code, marketed as 'Gran Coupe') body style was added to the lineup in October 2019. The M8 is powered by the BMW S63 twin-turbocharged V8 engine shared with the BMW M5 (F90).

Development and launch 

BMW revived the 8 Series nameplate by introducing the M8 GTE racecar (a first by BMW, as the brand usually introduces the production version first), which replaced the M6 GTLM at the end of the 2017 season of the IMSA WeatherTech SportsCar Championship, leading to speculation about a production equivalent to the racing car. At the 2018 Geneva Motor Show, BMW introduced the M8 Gran Coupé Concept, which previewed a high performance four-door variant of the Concept 8 Series introduced alongside the M8 GTE at the 2017 Frankfurt Motor Show. The design of the concept was based on the M8 GTE and sported aggressive M performance visual parts. Prototypes of the M8 began testing in June 2017 when another Concept of the 8 Series was unveiled to the public.

Development of the M8 continued into 2018 and more production ready prototypes were made available to the automotive press for review. The car was finally introduced online on 4 June 2019 in the high performance "Competition" variation in coupé and convertible bodystyles. Production began in August 2019.

Specifications 

The M8 is based on the BMW CLAR platform,  with strut and wishbone suspension at the front and multi-link suspension at the rear. Adaptive dampers are standard equipment. The all-wheel-drive system (called xDrive) has the ability to decouple its front axle to make the car purely rear-wheel-drive, a feature first introduced on the M5.

The M8 is powered by a version of the BMW S63 twin-turbocharged V8 engine which is shared with the M5, X5M and X6M models. The sole transmission available for the M8 is an 8-speed torque converter ZF 8HP76 automatic transmission manufactured by ZF Friedrichshafen called the "M-Steptronic" by BMW and also shared with the F90 M5.

The standard brakes consist of iron discs, with carbon ceramic brakes being optional. The level of power assist for the brakes can be set to either ‘comfort’ or ‘sport’ mode using the iDrive controller, a feature which has been criticised for resulting in inconsistent brake pedal feel.

The "M8 Competition" is the upper model of the range, with changes including increased engine power, a modified induction system and more rigid engine mounts.

The M8 can be fitted with M Performance Parts. These include a sport steering wheel, carbon fibre parts, side skirts, M rims and a bigger spoiler.

Performance 

Motorsport

M8 GTE

The racing version of the M8 called the M8 GTE was introduced at the 2017 Frankfurt Motor Show. The car made its competitive debut at the 2018 WeatherTech SportsCar Championship and the FIA WEC for the 2018 season marking BMW's return to endurance racing after 6 years.

M8 Safety car
In 2019, during the MotoGP Austrian Grand Prix, the M8 Competition made its debut as the official safety car, replacing the M5 Safety Car.

References 

M8
Cars introduced in 2019
Coupés
Convertibles
Grand tourers